SOV may refer to:
 SOV, Service Operations Vessel
 SOV, a former ticker symbol for Sovereign Bank
 SOV, a legal cryptocurrency created by the Sovereign Currency Act of 2018 of the Republic of the Marshall Islands
 SOV, the National Rail station code for Southend Victoria railway station, Southend-on-Sea, England
 SO Voiron, a French rugby union club
 Schedule of values
 Single-occupancy vehicle
 Subject–object–verb, used in linguistic typology
 Symphony Orchestra Vorarlberg, an Austrian orchestra
 Share of voice
 Sorin Ovidiu Vântu, a Romanian business man
 Store of value